Talon Esports is a professional esports organisation based in Hong Kong with teams competing across the Asia Pacific. Its League of Legends team is partnered with PSG Esports and known as PSG Talon. PSG Talon competes in the Pacific Championship Series, the top-level league for the game in Taiwan, Hong Kong, Macau, Southeast Asia, and Oceania.

League of Legends

History 
Riot Games announced on 19 December 2019 that Talon Esports would be one of ten teams participating in the newly created Pacific Championship Series. Talon Esports' inaugural roster consisted of top laner Su "Hanabi" Chia-hsiang, jungler Kim "River" Dong-woo, mid laner Kim "Candy" Seung-ju, bot laner Wong "Unified" Chun-kit, and support Ling "Kaiwing" Kai-wing.

Talon Esports finished third in the 2020 PCS Spring regular season, qualifying for the first round of playoffs in the winners' bracket. After winning three series and losing one, Talon Esports reached the finals where they faced off against Machi Esports. Talon Esports came out on top after a close series and won their first PCS title.

On 18 June 2020, Talon Esports announced that its League of Legends team had partnered with PSG Esports and would henceforth compete as PSG Talon. Mid laner Park "Tank" Dan-won was brought in as a substitute for the summer split, but was later promoted to the starting position after the departure of Candy on 9 July 2020.

In a repeat of the spring split, PSG Talon finished third in the 2020 PCS Summer regular season and reached the finals after defeating the same teams in spring. This qualified the team for the 2020 World Championship. PSG Talon later faced Machi Esports once again in a rematch of the spring finals; however, this time Machi Esports defeated PSG Talon, forcing PSG Talon to start in the play-in stage of Worlds as the PCS' second seed.

River and Tank were unable to participate in the play-in stage due to delayed visas, and were replaced with Hsiao "Kongyue" Jen-tso and Chen "Uniboy" Chang-chu respectively. Unified was also unable to participate in the first half of the play-in stage for the same reason, and was replaced with Chen "Dee" Chun-dee.

Despite starting the play-in stage with three emergency substitutes, PSG Talon won both their games on the first day of competition, including an upset victory over group favourites LGD Gaming. PSG Talon later topped their group and qualified for the tournament's main event. PSG Talon was placed in Group B for the main event, along with South Korea's DAMWON Gaming, China's JD Gaming, and Europe's Rogue. PSG Talon finished third in their group with a 2–4 win-loss record, ending their Worlds run.

PSG Talon announced the departure of Tank on 31 October 2021 and the signing of Huang "Maple" Yi-tang as his replacement on 
10 December.

PSG Talon finished first in the 2021 PCS Spring regular season, losing only a single game to second-place Beyond Gaming. The team later reached their third consecutive PCS finals and swept Beyond Gaming to win their second PCS title.

Unified was unable to participate in the 2021 Mid-Season Invitational (MSI 2021) due to recurring cases of pneumothorax. He was replaced with Beyond Gaming's Chiu "Doggo" Tzu-chuan.

For the group stage of MSI 2021, PSG Talon was placed in Group B, along with Europe's MAD Lions, Brazil's paiN Gaming, and Turkey's Istanbul Wildcats. PSG Talon finished second in their group with a 4–2 win–loss record, only losing to first-place MAD Lions, and qualified for the "rumble" stage of the tournament. PSG Talon finished third out of six teams in the rumble stage, advancing to the knockout stage. In the semifinals, China's Royal Never Give Up eliminated PSG Talon from the tournament after a four-game series.

PSG Talon placed first in the 2021 PCS Summer regular season, finishing undefeated. After sweeping J Team in the semifinals, PSG Talon qualified for the 2021 World Championship and their fourth consecutive PCS finals, where they defeated Beyond Gaming after another close series.

PSG Talon's first-place finish in the 2021 summer split qualified them for the main event of the 2021 World Championship. The team was placed in Group C, along with China's Royal Never Give Up, South Korea's Hanwha Life Esports, and Europe's Fnatic. PSG Talon finished third in their group and failed to qualify for the knockout stage.

Current roster

Arena of Valor

History 
Talon Esports extended its partnership with KFC on 31 January 2022 and gave the fast food chain naming rights to its Arena of Valor team. The team was subsequently rebranded as KFC Talon Esports.

Current roster

Overwatch 

Talon Esports joined the professional Overwatch scene in March 2017 by signing a Taipei-based roster, with Hongkonger Yip "Moowe" Chi-yeung being the only non-Taiwanese player. The team disbanded in late July after failing to qualify for the second season of the Overwatch Pacific Championship.

In early 2018, Talon Esports signed an all-Korean roster to compete in the Pacific division of Overwatch Contenders (later Pacific Contenders). The team has since underwent several roster changes and topped various Pacific Contenders seasons.

Talon Esports accepted an offer for a spot in the Korean Contenders Trials after the Pacific Contenders was discontinued. The team disbanded in September 2022.

Valorant 
On 22 September 2022, Talon Esports was announced as one of the partner teams for the Valorant APAC league.

Funding 
New Wave Esports Corporation, a Canadian company which provides capital and advisory services to esports teams, announced a strategic investment in Talon Esports on 18 November 2019.

Sean Zhang, CEO and co-founder of Talon Esports, announced on 12 October 2020 that his organisation had secured US$2 million in seed funding from investors, including Felix LaHaye.

References

External links 
 

2016 establishments in Hong Kong
Esports teams established in 2016
Esports teams based in Hong Kong
Pacific Championship Series teams
Overwatch Contenders teams